Chet Baker in New York is an album by trumpeter Chet Baker recorded in 1958 and released on the Riverside label early the following year. The album includes a Benny Golson composition, "Fair Weather", that is not to be confused with a Kenny Dorham song of the same name that Baker recorded in 1986 for the Round Midnight sountrack album.

Reception

Allmusic awarded the album with 4 stars, stating: "Chet Baker in New York is a highly recommended entry into Baker's catalog."

Track listing
 "Fair Weather" (Benny Golson) - 6:58
 "Polka Dots and Moonbeams" (Johnny Burke, Jimmy Van Heusen) - 7:56
 "Hotel 49" (Owen Marshall) - 9:48   
 "Solar" (Miles Davis) - 5:52
 "Blue Thoughts" (Golson) - 7:33
 "When Lights Are Low" (Benny Carter, Spencer Williams) - 6:52
 "Soft Winds" (Benny Goodman, Fletcher Henderson) - 6:26 Bonus track on CD reissue

Personnel
Chet Baker - trumpet
Johnny Griffin - tenor saxophone (tracks  1, 3 & 5)
Al Haig - piano
Paul Chambers - bass
Philly Joe Jones - drums

References 

1959 albums
Chet Baker albums
Riverside Records albums
Albums produced by Orrin Keepnews